Soldiers of the King is a 1933 British historical comedy film directed by Maurice Elvey and starring Cicely Courtneidge, Edward Everett Horton and Anthony Bushell. It was Courtneidge's fourth film, and the first she appeared in without her husband Jack Hulbert. Courtneidge plays the matriarch of a music hall family, in a plot that switches between the Victorian era and the 1930s present.

Filming began in August 1932. It was shot at Islington, Beaconsfield and Welwyn Studios. The film's art direction is by Alex Vetchinsky. It was popular enough to be re-issued in 1939.

Cast
 Cicely Courtneidge as Jenny Marvello / Maisie Marvello  
 Edward Everett Horton as Sebastian Marvello 
 Anthony Bushell as Lieutenant Ronald Jamieson 
 Dorothy Hyson as Judy Marvello 
 Frank Cellier as Colonel Philip Markham 
 Leslie Sarony as Wally 
 Bransby Williams as Dan Marvello 
 Albert Rebla as Albert Marvello 
 Herschel Henlere as Mozart Marvello 
 Ivor McLaren as Harry Marvello 
 Olive Sloane as Sarah Marvello  
 Arty Ash as Doug
 O. B. Clarence as Tom
 David Deveen as Frank Marvello  
 André Rolet as Marvello Adagio Troupe member 
 Betty Semsey as Marvello Adagio Troupe member
 William Pardue as Marvello Adagio Troupe member  
 Ian Wilson as Customer at Coffee Stall

Critical reception
In 1933, The Sydney Morning Herald wrote, "It is Cicely Courtneldge's personality which carries Soldiers of the King to the moderate success which it achieves. Again and again, since the coming of talking films, the English studios have put forth flimsy stories of this character – stories which subside into horrific dulness when the actors do not exert themselves, and when the actors do put forth heroic efforts prove entertaining, but not commensurately so. If only the genius of English players could be backed by soldier, more close-knit thematic material, British films would reach brilliant heights of artistry. Perhaps the present migration of American actors and technical experts to London, counterbalancing a migration of English actors to Hollywood, will have an influence in this direction. It would be extremely pleasant to be able to record the arrival from England of a film equalling Lubltsch's memorable American production, Trouble in Paradise. Meanwhile, one can accept In a cheerful spirit this new vehicle for Miss Courtneldge's comic gifts. The actress has spent some time on the variety stage. So much becomes at once apparent when she begins to move on the screen. Her performance is one long romp, in which she fools to her heart's content, and continually sacrifices development of character to effect's of burlesque...Not even her most rabid admirers would claim that she Is beautiful, either in feature or in form. It is her very angularity and her frank, genial homeliness which cause patrons of theatres to love her. The more undignified she can make herself look the better pleased she seems to be, and It Is good policy; for some of her strokes of grotesquerie are calculated to make any audience laugh its head off. Miss Courtneidge (who in private life is Mrs. Jack Hulbert) was born in Sydney, her father, Robert Courtneidge, being then on a tour of Australia, together with his wife, in the Gaiety Company. She has already been seen on the "screen in The Ghost Train and Jack's the Boy...Told more deftly and succinctly, the story of the Marvellos might have had a serious as well as a farcical Interest, but at present this Just misses fire. Edward Everett Horton, fresh from triumphs in Hollywood, provides invaluable support for Miss Courtneidge in his inimitable way; and Anthony Bushell, also frequently visible until lately In American films, makes an attractive juvenile lead. Soldiers of the King, released by the Fox Film Corporation, was screened on Saturday at the Plaza Theatre."

References

Bibliography
 Harper, Sue. Picturing the Past: The Rise and Fall of the British Costume Film. British Film Institute, 1994.
 Sutton, David R. A Chorus of Raspberries: British Film Comedy 1929-1939. University of Exeter Press, 2000.  
 Wood, Linda. British Films 1929-1939. British Film Institute, 1986.

External links

1933 films
British black-and-white films
1930s historical comedy films
1930s English-language films
Films directed by Maurice Elvey
Films shot at Beaconsfield Studios
Islington Studios films
Films shot at Welwyn Studios
Gainsborough Pictures films
British historical comedy films
1930s British films